The 2015 NAIA Division II Men’s Basketball national championship was held in March at Keeter Gymnasium in Point Lookout, Missouri. The 24th annual NAIA basketball tournament featured thirty-two teams playing in a single-elimination format. The championship game was won by Cornerstone University of Grand Rapids, Michigan over Dakota Wesleyan University of Mitchell, South Dakota by a score of 66 to 45.

Tournament field
The 2015 tournament field was announced on March 14 in a live selection show. The field is made up of 23 automatic qualifiers and eight at-large bids and one automatic host bid presented to College of the Ozarks. This tournament field welcomed the return of four out of the last five champions, led by defending champion and top seed Indiana Wesleyan University along with Cardinal Stritch, Cornerstone, and Saint Francis.  There were four newcomers to the bracket, Brescia, Northwestern Ohio, Olivet Nazarene and St. Francis of Illinois.

The complete field consists of Ashford, Bellevue, Bethel, Brescia, Briar Cliff, Cal Maritime, Cardinal Stritch, Concordia, Cornerstone, Dakota State, Davenport, Embry-Riddle, Friends, Grace, College of Idaho, Indiana University East, Indiana Wesleyan, Midland, Milligan, Morningside, Mount Mercy, Northwestern Ohio, Olivet Nazarene, College of the Ozarks, Saint Francis, Saint Thomas, Southern Oregon, Tabor, Union, and Warner Pacific.

Highlights

Fab Four
The fifth ranked Dakota Wesleyan Tigers came back from a twelve point deficit to defeat the College of Idaho Yotes 88-80 and advance to the NAIA championship game.  On the other side of the bracket, Davenport hit three free throws in the final six seconds to secure a 79-75 win over defending champion Indiana Wesleyan.

Championship game

Cornerstone won their third national championship, defeating Dakota Wesleyan 66-45 behind a twenty-four point performance by Ben Lanning.

Tourney awards and honors
Dr. James Naismith/Emil Liston Team Sportsmanship Award: Southern Oregon

Individual recognition
Most Outstanding Player: Dominez Burnett, Davenport
Championship Hustle Award: Luke Bamberg, Dakota Wesleyan
NABC/NAIA Division II Coach of the Year: Kim Elders, Cornerstone
Rawlings-NAIA Division II National Coach of the Year: Matt Wilber, Dakota Wesleyan
2015 NAIA Division II Men’s Basketball All-Championship Team

Statistical leaders
(minimum 4 games)

Bracket

Epilogue

When the NAIA Division II Men’s Basketball All-America Teams, almost all the players were represented at the national tournament, with a few notable exceptions including Lawrence Jackson of Northwestern Ohio, Jordan Nelson of Waldorf, Andre Winston of Southeastern.

NAIA Division II Men’s Basketball All-America Teams

1st Team

 - denotes NAIA/NABC Player of the Year

2nd Team

3rd Team

Honorable Mention

See also
2015 NAIA Division I men's basketball tournament
2015 NCAA Division I men's basketball tournament
2015 NCAA Division II men's basketball tournament
2015 NCAA Division III men's basketball tournament
2015 NAIA Division II women's basketball tournament

References

NAIA Men's Basketball Championship
2015 in sports in Missouri
Tournament